The 14th Gujarat Legislative Assembly election, 2017 was held on 9 December 2017 and 14 December 2017 in the Indian state of Gujarat to elect the Members of Legislative Assembly (MLA). The votes were counted on 18 December. All 182 members of the 14th Gujarat Legislative Assembly were elected with the leader of the largest party or coalition expected to become the next chief minister.

The incumbent Bharatiya Janata Party obtained a simple majority with an increase in the vote share. Despite suffering a decrease in the number of seats, the incumbent government retained a simple majority in the house. The vote share and number of seats for Congress increased from the previous election in 2012. This was the highest number of seats won by the Congress in the last 32 years (after the 1985 election, in which Congress won 149 seats). The next election will be in December 2022.

Background 
Gujarat, like the other states of India, follows parliamentary system of government. The government is responsible for the Legislative Assembly and stays in power only if it has the support of a majority of its members. Elections take place on a first-past-the-post basis: the candidate with the most votes wins the seat regardless of an absolute majority. Every citizen of the state who is 18 and above is eligible to vote. The respective governors of the state then invite the leader of the largest party or coalition to form the government. The Constitution of India states that the term of Legislative Assemblies is five years. As is common in most other first-past-the-post electoral systems, the state's politics are dominated by two parties – the Indian National Congress (INC) and the Bharatiya Janata Party (BJP).

The term of the prior Gujarat Legislative Assembly ended on 22 January 2018. The previous assembly election, held in 2012, resulted in BJP gaining a majority of seats and Narendra Modi becoming the chief minister. After the 2014 General Elections, Modi became the prime minister of the country and Anandiben Patel was appointed the chief minister of Gujarat. After the Patidar agitations, Dalit protests and claims of poor governance, she was replaced by Vijay Rupani as the chief minister by the party.

Electoral process changes

VVPAT-fitted EVMs were used in the entire Gujarat state at 50,128 polling stations in the 2017 elections, which was the first time that the entire state saw the implementation of VVPAT. VVPAT slips were counted in a polling station in each of Gujarat's 182 constituencies. There were 43.3 million registered voters in Gujarat as of September 25, 2017.

Demographics

Other Backward Castes, excluding Muslim OBCs, comprised 48% of the total population of Gujarat. 147 communities were considered to be OBCs at the time of the election. Scheduled tribes (primarily Adivasis) comprised 15.5% of the population, while scheduled castes (Dalits) totalled 7%. Muslims of various castes constituted 9.7% of the population. Forward castes and others made up the remainder.

Campaigns

Bhartiya Janata Party
Jaitley said continuous growth, unity and concern for every section are main ingredients of BJP manifesto. He said social polarization path attempted by Congress will harm the State like what happened in the decade of 1980s.Jaitley said Congress had mentioned some programmes that are already implemented by BJP government. The government is already giving minimum support price for ground nut, delivering crop insurance, assistance for check dam and drip irrigation, loan under Mudra schemes 

Prime Minister Narendra Modi had addressed 34 public rallies in his home state.

Manifesto:

Agri Proposals:
 Continue with the current policies for improving farm income
 To continue with Cooperative milk societies and animal welfare
 Effective implementation of law against cow slaughter

Youth Proposals:
 To open up more industrial cluster to increase Employment
 To encourage start-ups through skill development and Economic support
 Labour & remuneration policies to reflect current needs
 Along with govt policies to have results oriented employment policies
 To establish Gujarat Olympic Mission
 To create modern sports facilities and provide economic support for sports persons
 To encourage traditional sports

For Women:
 To set up a fund for women empowerment schemes
 Free higher education for women
 Healthcare facilities for women
 New women oriented policies
 To increase widow pension from time to time

Education Policy:
 To expand policies for welfare of girl child and schooling
 To expand foundational education
 To include new technological innovations in educations
 More importance to vocational education
 To better implement fee control in Private schools
 To create world class universities in the state

Healthcare:
 To provide better facilities for treatment of grave illnesses in district hospitals
 To increase availability of generic and affordable medicines
 To set up mobile clinics and 252 government diagnostic laboratories
 To free Gujarat of vector-borne diseases by 2022

Village Development:
 Cement houses for poor families
 All houses to have plumbing and toilet facilities
 To bring in waste disposal units
 Better transportation and connectivity for rural areas

Urban Development:
 Timely implementation of smart city projects
 Effective and smart traffic management systems
 Surat and Vadodhara to have metro train services
 Pipe gas connections in all houses
 AC- Bus services in major cities
 Playground facilities for children in all sectors
 Multi-level parking facilities
 Control on unlawful occupation of land

Industrial Policies:
 Policy based industrial growth
 Encouragement to Employment oriented industries
 Regulated policy for industries
 New policy for Semi-conductor and Telecommunications industries
 Government to collaborate with GIDC for global competitive industrial policies
 Better interest rates for SME lending
 To create help centres for entrepreneurs
 To ease licensing policy for Small traders via online
 Accounting services to be provided at affordable rates
 Considerable improvement in policies for co-operative societies
 Revival of closed co-operative units

Tribal Welfare:
 Effective implementation of tribal protection laws
 To create Tribal Development Board at district level
 To create registered Tribal committees
 To provide irrigation facilities in 4 lakh hectares of land in North-east tribal areas
 Special policies for Agariya communities
 Better implementation of PESA Act
 To provide land owner ship for all Tribals
 To set-up International levels tribal universities

OBC Welfare:
 To provide economic support for those in generational family businesses
 To double the grant for Thakore and Koli development corporation
 Expansion of Self-employement schemes

SC and ST Welfare:
 To create a committee for their betterment
 Easing of processes for obtaining caste certificate and BPL card
 Cement houses for everybody
 Better opportunity for education, healthcare and employment
 Creation of hawking zones for hawkers

Dalit Welfare:
 Effective protection of Dalits
 Economic support through Dr BhimRao Ambedkar Education fund
 Increase in schools
 Financial support for Dalit workers

Poor Labourers and Workers:
 100% coverage under Suraksha Bhima Yojana
 Cement Houses for all
 Affordable healthcare
 Affordable food policies to be expanded in cities

Financially Backward Communities:
 To fund secondary and high education of students
 Financial security through Jan Dhan and PM Suraksha Bima Yojana
 New policies for holistic development of poor
 Better opportunities for employment

Ports:
 Develop ports and better marine traffic routes
 To expand RORO ferry services
 To provide financial support to communities dependent on sea
 To give financial support for Modern equipment
 To create Marine product laboratory for improvement of manufacturing

Transparent and Better Governance:
 Administrative public outreach programme
 Karm-yogi Abhiyaan for Government employees
 Online services for registration and tax payment
 Forceful implementation of Anti-liquor policies

Tourism:
 To create Sardar Patel Statue at Karmsad
 New tourism circuits
 To create yoga and medication centre in Saurashtra in association with Somnath University
 To promote Handicraft festivals
 To create memorials for great Gujarati personalities
 Better facilities for Pilgrims

Cultural Policies:
 To promote language, literature and dance forms
 To promote ras-garba and traditional art forms
 To encourage music along with literature and language
 To create and expand Art festivals
 To reserve position in Girnar authority Board for saints
 To support for religious festivals like Maha Shivratri & Lili Parikarma

Senior Citizens:
 Timely increase in old-age pension
 To provide government services at home
 Expand the Shravan tirth policy

For NRI Gujarati:
 Gujarat tour services for NRIs
 To immediately resolve issues of NRIs
 To promote Gujarati cultural activities outside India

Indian National Congress

Manifesto:

Woman and Healthcare:
 Housing for women of all communities
 Free education for girls from primary to higher education
 Loans for women to start small businesses
 Universal healthcare card

Farmers:
 Loan waiver
 Free water
 16-hour daytime power
 Effective crop insurance

Rural and Housing:
 Each village to have sanitation and drinking water
 25 Lakh houses in 5 years in urban and rural areas

Business, Law & Order:
 Ending of Gundaraj in Gujarat
 Establishing fast-track courts for serious crimes
 HC bench in Surat, Rajkot 

cost of living and inflation:
 Petrol, diesel cheaper by Rs 10
 50% reduction in property tax for small shopkeepers
 Up to 50% reduction in electricity rates

For youth & students:
 Unemployment allowance of up to Rs 4,000 to youth
 Rs 32,000 cr fund for employment to 25 lakh youth
 Withdrawal of contractual outsourcing and filling of government vacancies
 Scholarship for poor and middle-class families
 Conversion of all self-financed courses into govt-aid courses to reduce fee burden
 Free laptops and phones to college students

Polls

Opinion polls

Exit polls
Exit polls were released on the evening of December 14.

Results
The votes were counted on 18 December 2017. Over 1.9% of all voters in the election specified the None of the Above (NOTA) option, which amounted to more than 500,000 votes.

Results by district

Results by constituency

By-Elections

2019

2020 

In March 2020, five Congress MLAs from Gujarat resigned, bringing its tally down to 68. Three more resigned in June 2020, making it 65. The BJP subsequently won all eight seats in November by-elections with absolute majorities of the vote.

2021

Notes

References

External links
 Election Commission of India
 Gujarat Legislative Assembly, Official website 

2017 State Assembly elections in India
2017
2017